Hurricane Condition (HURCON) is an alert scale used by the United States Armed Forces in the North Atlantic and the North Pacific to indicate the state of emergency or preparedness for an approaching hurricane. This designation is especially important to installations in the southern Atlantic region, as it is most affected by hurricanes. In the western Pacific, where hurricanes are referred to as typhoons, the scale is called Tropical Cyclone Condition of Readiness (TCCOR). A HURCON or TCCOR can be issued up to 96 hours before a hurricane is expected to strike the installation.

HURCON conditions
As of 2021, the scale - which has been updated several times, and has minor variations between different military bases - consists of 5 levels, from HURCON 5 to HURCON 1, with three additional sub-levels for HURCON 1. As with civilian alerts, buildings may be boarded up and personnel evacuated. In addition; aircraft, ships, equipment, and other assets will be relocated, tied down, bunkered, or otherwise secured. The contraction was chosen in line with other military terminology in use like DEFCON and FPCON to communicate hazardous conditions.

TCCOR conditions
As of 2021, TCCOR consists of TCCOR 5 to TCCOR 1, three additional sub-levels for TCCOR 1, TCCOR Storm Watch, and TCCOR All Clear.

Notes
 It is possible to return to TCCOR Storm Watch or TCCOR 4 from a higher level of alert if the storm is no longer forecast to reach destructive wind criteria at the installation.
 Destructive wind criteria: 50 knots sustained or gust factors of 60 knots or greater.

In popular culture 
This article was the topic of conversation in the third episode of series three of the web series "Two Of These People Are Lying" hosted by The Technical Difficulties.

References

Weather warnings and advisories
Alert measurement systems
Military terminology of the United States